Steatopygia is the state of having substantial levels of tissue on the buttocks and thighs. This build is not confined to the gluteal regions, but extends to the outside and front of the thighs, and tapers to the knee producing a curvilinear figure.

Steatopygia, a genetic characteristic leading to increased accumulation of adipose tissue in the buttock region, is most notably (but not solely) found among the Khoisan of Southern Africa.  It has also been observed among Pygmies of Central Africa and also the Andamanese people, such as the Onge tribe in the Andaman Islands. This genetic characteristic is prevalent among women but occurs to a lesser degree in men. Among the Khoisan, it begins in infancy and is fully developed by the time of the first pregnancy.

It has been suggested that this feature was once more widespread. Paleolithic Venus figurines, sometimes referred to as "Steatopygian Venus" figures, discovered from Europe to Asia presenting a remarkable development of the thighs, and even the  prolongation of the labia minora, have been used to support this theory. Whether these were intended to be lifelike, exaggeratory, or idealistic is unclear. These figures, however, may not qualify as steatopygian, since they exhibit an angle of approximately 120 degrees between the back and the buttocks, while steatopygia is typically described with an angle of about 90 degrees only.

In Victorian England, freak shows were known to have exploited a woman with steatopygia at least once. The most well-known example was a South African Khoikhoi woman named Saartjie Baartman, who is thought to have had lipedema.

See also
Female body shape
Feminine beauty ideal

References

External links 

Anthropology
Lower limb anatomy
Buttocks